The Glaser coupling is a type of coupling reaction. It is by far the oldest acetylenic coupling and is based on cuprous salts like copper(I) chloride or copper(I) bromide and an additional oxidant like oxygen. The base in its original scope is ammonia. The solvent is water or an alcohol.
He suggested the following process for his way to diphenylbutadiyne:
CuCl + PhC2H + NH3 → PhC2Cu + NH4Cl
4PhC2Cu + O2 → 2PhC2C2Ph + 2Cu2O

Modifications

Eglinton reaction

In the related Eglinton reaction two terminal alkynes are coupled by a copper(II) salt such as cupric acetate.
2R-\!{\equiv}\!-H ->[\ce{Cu(OAc)2}][\ce{pyridine}] R-\!{\equiv}\!-\!{\equiv}\!-R

The oxidative coupling of alkynes has been used to synthesize a number of fungal antibiotics. The stoichiometry is represented by this highly simplified scheme:

Such reactions proceed via copper(I)-alkyne complexes.

This methodology was used in the synthesis of cyclooctadecanonaene. Another example is the synthesis of diphenylbutadiyne from phenylacetylene.

Hay coupling
The Hay coupling is variant of the Glaser coupling. It relies on the TMEDA complex of copper(I) chloride to activate the terminal alkyne. Oxygen (air) is used in the Hay variant to oxidize catalytic amounts of Cu(I) to Cu(II) throughout the reaction, as opposed to a stoichiometric amount of Cu(II) used in the Eglington variant. The Hay coupling of trimethylsilylacetylene gives the butadiyne derivative.

Scope
In 1882 Adolf von Baeyer used the method to prepare 1,4-bis(2-nitrophenyl)butadiyne, en route to indigo dye.

Shortly afterwards, Baeyer reported a different route to indigo, now known as the Baeyer–Drewson indigo synthesis.

See also
 Cadiot–Chodkiewicz coupling - Another alkyne coupling reaction catalysed by copper(I).
 Sonogashira coupling - Pd/Cu catalysed coupling of an alkyne and an aryl or vinyl halide
 Castro–Stephens coupling - A cross-coupling reaction between a copper(I) acetylide and an aryl halide
 Fritsch–Buttenberg–Wiechell rearrangement - can also form diynes

References

Carbon-carbon bond forming reactions
Name reactions